is a 1993 Japanese film directed by Yōji Yamada. It was chosen as Best Film at the Japan Academy Prize ceremony.

Synopsis
A cantankerous but loveable high school teacher teaches a night school in a poor neighborhood for adult students on the fringes of Japanese society.

Cast
 Toshiyuki Nishida
 Eiko Shinya
 Keiko Takeshita
 Nae Yuuki
 Kunie Tanaka
 Kiyoshi Atsumi
 Masato Hagiwara
 Yuri Nakae
 Hiroshi Kanbe
 Senri Oe
 Takashi Sasano
 Shinya Owada
 Kayako Sono
 Jiro Sakagami
 Kei Suma

Reception
At the 1994 Japan Academy Prize the film won the awards for Best Film, Best Director, Best Screenplay, Best Actor, Best Supporting Actor, Best Sound, Rookie of the Year and the Popularity Award. It was also nominated for Best Supporting Actress, Best Music, Best Cinematography, Best Lighting Direction, Best Art Direction and Best Editing.

Gakko series
 A Class to Remember (1993)
 Gakko II (1996)
 Gakko III (1998)
 Jyu Gosai Gakko IV (2000)

References

External links
 
 
 
 
 
 
 

1993 films
1993 drama films
Films directed by Yoji Yamada
Japanese drama films
1990s Japanese-language films
Shochiku films
Picture of the Year Japan Academy Prize winners
Films with screenplays by Yôji Yamada
Films scored by Isao Tomita
1990s Japanese films